Cheshmeh Khosrow or Chashmeh Khosrow or Chashmeh-ye Kosrow may refer to:
 Cheshmeh Khosrow, Kermanshah
 Cheshmeh Khosrow, Razavi Khorasan